Hanna Klinga (born 13 November 1989) is a Swedish sailor. She and Lisa Ericson placed 11th in the 49erFX event at the 2016 Summer Olympics.

References

External links
 
 
 

1989 births
Living people
Swedish female sailors (sport)
Olympic sailors of Sweden
Sailors at the 2016 Summer Olympics – 49er FX